The following is a list of Miss World pageant edition and information.

Host country/territory by number

Notes

References

Editions
Lists of beauty pageants editions